Manuel de Roda y Arrieta (5 February 1708 – 30 August 1782) was a Spanish diplomat and politician. He was Ambassador in Rome under King Ferdinand VI of Spain and then nominated by King Charles III of Spain, half-brother of Ferdinand VI and formerly King of Naples and Sicily till the death of his half-brother Ferdinand, Ministry of "Grace and Justice", which he held for 17 years.

Biography
Born in Zaragoza on 5 February 1708, he participated actively in the creation of the Royal Spanish Academy of History (1735–1738).

As a Jansenist and adviser to Charles III during the reformist era that produced the Esquilache Riots attributed to Jesuit agitation, Roda was instrumental in the expulsion of the Jesuits in 1767 from Spain and Spanish overseas possessions in Europe, America and the Philippine Islands. The Portuguese expelled the Jesuits from all their domains earlier (circa 1759),  under Sebastião José de Carvalho e Melo, 1st Count of Oeiras, 1st Marquis of Pombal.

The Society of Jesus as an Institution would be banned on July 21, 1773 by the Pope Clement XIV via the brief "Dominus ac Redemptor". Russia, Prussia and Poland (then absorbed by Russia) denied papal catholic authority (and Bourbon's influence) and in their kingdom forbade the promulgation of the brief ordering the Jesuits to carry on their educational activities wherever they were.

Roda died at the Royal Site of San Ildefonso, Segovia. There, he was buried at the "Christ Chapel" of this Summer Royal Palace, requesting that the King pass his title of Marquis of Roda to Miguel Joaquín Lorieri, who was married to his niece Francisca de Alpuente y Roda.

References

Further reading 
 RAFAEL OLAECHEA, Las relaciones hispano-romanas en la segunda mitad del XVIII (in Spanish),  Institución Fernando el Católico, Zaragoza (1999), 
 ISIDORO PINEDO IPARRAGUIRRE, "Manuel de Roda y Arrieta, ministro de Carlos III", in Letras de Deusto, Vol. 12, no. 23, (1982), pp. 97-110. .
 JESUS PRADELLS NADAL, "Política, libros y polémicas culturales en la correspondencia extraoficial de Ignacio de Heredia (y Alamán) con Manuel de Roda (1773-1781)", Revista de historia moderna,  N. 18 (1999–2000). ISSN 0212-5862, pp. 125–222
 Refined extract by A.E. on this net link: Correspondence with Minister of Justice de Roda from Ignacio de Heredia (Spanish Embassy in Paris, as Secretary of the Ambassador Count of Aranda, Pedro Pablo Abarca de Bolea y Jiménez de Urrea, 10th Count of Aranda, 1718-1798), dealing with Spanish literature, the lawsuits against Pablo de Olavide y Jáuregui (1725-1803), the comments on the Spanish defeat of 1775 trying to conquer the African city of Alger, and the purchasing orders for Paris librarians to enhance the magnificent library of de Roda, today conserved and visited by prestigious hispanists in the Real Seminario de San Carlos de Zaragoza.

1706 births
1782 deaths
18th century in Spain
People from Zaragoza